The South African Gymnastics Federation is the overall governing body of the sports of gymnastics in South Africa. Established in 1931, the body is affiliated to the International Federation of Gymnastics, the African Gymnastics Union and the South African Sports Confederation and Olympic Committee (SASCOC), and recognized by Sport and Recreation South Africa (SRSA).

The SAGF governs nine gymnastics disciplines as follows:

 Men's Artistic Gymnastics 
 Women's Artistic Gymnastics 
 Rhythmic Gymnastics
 Aerobic Gymnastics
 Acrobatic Gymnastics
 Trampoline & Tumbling
 Rope Skipping
 Gym for All (GFA)
 Schools Gymnastics

The SAGF is involved from the grassroots development level to the elite gymnastics level in all the 9 Provinces of South Africa, in partnership with its provincial affiliates.

References

External links
 Official website

National members of the African Gymnastics Union
Gymnastics
Gymnastics in South Africa
1931 establishments in South Africa
South African gymnasts
Olympic gymnasts of South Africa
Sports organizations established in 1931